Bloody Mannequin Orchestra were an influential early 1980s punk band from Bethesda, MD.  They formed around a small, but active, scene at Bethesda-Chevy Chase High School and were part of the larger D.C hardcore community.  The band members were Colin Sears, Roger Marbury, Alex Mahoney, Sharon Cheslow and Charles Bennington.

Cheslow had been in Chalk Circle, "the first all-female band to emerge from harDCore," before BMO. Sears and Marbury went on to form the mid-'80s Revolution Summer era Dischord Records band Dag Nasty with Brian Baker of Minor Threat.

BMO released cassettes and the Roadmap to Revolution LP on WGNS, a label started by Sears, Cheslow and Geoff Turner (later in Gray Matter).  Cheslow and Sears also published the fanzine If This Goes On.  BMO, like other Bethesda bands, were known for their smart, playful music with a political consciousness.

Notes

References 
Andersen, Mark and Jenkins, Mark (2001). Dance of Days: Two Decades of Punk in the Nation's Capital. Akashic Books.

External links
Bloody Mannequin Orchestra history

Punk rock groups from Maryland